is a former Japanese football player and manager. He is the current manager of Roasso Kumamoto.

Playing career
Oki was born in Shizuoka on July 16, 1961. After graduating from Tokyo University of Agriculture, he played Fujitsu from 1984 to 1991.

Coaching career
In 1993, Oki he became coach for Shimizu S-Pulse. In 2002, he moved to Ventforet Kofu and he became a manager. In 2003, he returned to Shimizu S-Pulse and managed the club. In 2004, he signed with Kawasaki Frontale and he coached youth team. In 2005, he returned to Ventforet Kofu. End of 2007 season, he resigned and he became an assistant coach for the Japan national team under manager Takeshi Okada until 2010 World Cup. In 2011, he signed with Kyoto Sanga FC and he managed until 2013. In 2017, he signed with FC Gifu. In June 2019, he resigned when team was at the bottom place.On 12 December 2019, Oki was announced will be appointed as the manager of J3 League club, Roasso Kumamoto from 2020.  Kumamoto finished 8th place in J3 League in 2020, leading J3 League promotion in 2021 The team returned to J2 League after being relegated in 2018. In 2022, the team will also achieve a record 4th place, which is the highest ever.

Managerial statistics
 Update; end of the 2022 season.

Honours

Manager
 Roasso Kumamoto
 J3 League : 2021

 Individual
 J2 League Manager of the Year : 2022

References

External links

1961 births
Living people
Tokyo University of Agriculture alumni
Association football people from Shizuoka Prefecture
Japanese footballers
Japan Soccer League players
Kawasaki Frontale players
Japanese football managers
J1 League managers
J2 League managers
J3 League managers
Ventforet Kofu managers
Shimizu S-Pulse managers
Kyoto Sanga FC managers
FC Gifu managers
Roasso Kumamoto managers
Association football midfielders